In enzymology, a methylglutamate dehydrogenase is an enzyme that catalyzes the chemical reaction

N-methyl-L-glutamate + acceptor + H2O  L-glutamate + formaldehyde + reduced acceptor

The 3 substrates of this enzyme are N-methyl-L-glutamate, acceptor, and H2O, whereas its 3 products are L-glutamate, formaldehyde, and reduced acceptor.

This enzyme belongs to the family of oxidoreductases, specifically those acting on the CH-NH group of donors with other acceptors.  The systematic name of this enzyme class is N-methyl-L-glutamate:acceptor oxidoreductase (demethylating). Other names in common use include N-methylglutamate dehydrogenase, and N-methyl-L-glutamate:(acceptor) oxidoreductase (demethylating).  This enzyme participates in methane metabolism.

References

 

EC 1.5.99
Enzymes of unknown structure